Kim Jun-Yeop (born 10 May 1988) is a South Korean footballer who plays as a midfielder and forward for Incheon United. He previously had spells in K League 1 for Daegu FC, Jeju United amongst others.

External links 

1988 births
Living people
Association football forwards
South Korean footballers
Jeju United FC players
Gwangju FC players
Gyeongnam FC players
Asan Mugunghwa FC players
Bucheon FC 1995 players
Daegu FC players
Incheon United FC players
K League 2 players
K League 1 players